AutoMuseum Volkswagen is an automobile museum in Wolfsburg, Lower Saxony, Germany. Opened in April 1985, it is one of two museums in Wolfsburg devoted to the history of the Volkswagen brand; the other is at nearby Autostadt.

The museum houses around 130 cars on permanent display ranging from the earliest VW Beetles to concept design studies of VW models. The museum is housed in a former clothing factory, very close to the Volkswagen Werke, where new Volkswagens are made.  Since January 1992, it has been owned and operated by a charitable foundation, Stiftung AutoMuseum Volkswagen.

See also
August Horch Museum Zwickau
museum mobile
List of automobile museums

References

Notes

Bibliography

External links

AutoMuseum Volkswagen – official site 

TourismusRegion BraunschweigerLAND: ZeitOrte - Expeditionen ins Zeitreiseland - AutoMuseum Volkswagen – visitor information 

Automobile museums in Germany
Buildings and structures in Wolfsburg
Museums in Lower Saxony
Wolfsburg